In mathematics, a Noetherian topological space, named for Emmy Noether, is a topological space in which closed subsets satisfy the descending chain condition.  Equivalently, we could say that the open subsets satisfy the ascending chain condition, since they are the complements of the closed subsets.  The Noetherian property of a topological space can also be seen as a strong compactness condition, namely that every open subset of such a space is compact, and in fact it is equivalent to the seemingly stronger statement that every subset is compact.

Definition 
A topological space  is called Noetherian if it satisfies the descending chain condition for closed subsets: for any sequence  

Properties 
 Every subspace of a Noetherian space is Noetherian.
 The continuous image of a Noetherian space is Noetherian.
 A finite union of Noetherian subspaces of a topological space is Noetherian.
 Every Hausdorff Noetherian space is finite with the discrete topology.
 Proof: Every subset of X is compact in a Hausdorff space, hence closed.  So X has the discrete topology, and being compact, it must be finite.
 Every Noetherian space X has a finite number of irreducible components.

From algebraic geometry 

Many examples of Noetherian topological spaces come from algebraic geometry, where for the Zariski topology an irreducible set has the intuitive property that any closed proper subset has smaller dimension. Since dimension can only 'jump down' a finite number of times, and algebraic sets are made up of finite unions of irreducible sets, descending chains of Zariski closed sets must eventually be constant.

A more algebraic way to see this is that the associated ideals defining algebraic sets must satisfy the ascending chain condition. That follows because the rings of algebraic geometry, in the classical sense, are Noetherian rings. This class of examples therefore also explains the name. 

If R is a commutative Noetherian ring, then  Spec(R), the prime spectrum of R, is a Noetherian topological space. More generally, a Noetherian scheme is a Noetherian topological space. The converse does not hold, since Spec(R) of a one-dimensional valuation domain R consists of exactly two points and therefore is Noetherian, but there are examples of such rings which are not Noetherian.

Example 
The space   (affine -space over a field ) under the Zariski topology is an example of a Noetherian topological space.

is a descending chain of Zariski-closed subsets, then

is an ascending chain of ideals of    Since  is a Noetherian ring, there exists an integer  such that  

Since  is the closure of Y for all Y,  for all   Hence

 as required.

Notes

References

Algebraic geometry
Properties of topological spaces
Scheme theory
Wellfoundedness